"Why?" is a song by the band Earth, Wind & Fire, released as a single in 2015 by Kalimba Music. The single peaked at No. 19 on the Billboard Smooth Jazz Songs chart.

Overview
"Why?" was produced and written by Maurice White and Gregory Curtis. The song also came from EW&F's 2003 studio album The Promise.

Appearances in other media
Why? appeared on the soundtrack of the 2002 feature film The Adventures of Pluto Nash.

Critical reception
Chairman Mao of Blender called Why? a "sweeping ballad". Renee Graham of the Boston Globe said Maurice White's "voice is steady and sweet especially on the uptempo ballad, Why".

Credits
Alto Saxophone – Gerald Albright 
Percussion – Paulinho Da Costa
Backing Vocals – Fred White, Gregory Curtis, Sheila Hutchinson, Wanda Vaughn
Bass – Verdine White
Composer - Maurice White, Gregory Curtis
Engineer – Cameron Marcarelli
Guitar -  Darrell Crooks
Keyboards, Drum Programming – Gregory Curtis
Lead Vocals - Maurice White
Producer - Maurice White, Gregory Curtis

References

2015 singles
2015 songs
Earth, Wind & Fire songs
Songs written by Maurice White